Gymnocalycium stellatum is a species of Gymnocalycium from Argentina.

References

External links
 
 

stellatum
Flora of Argentina
Taxa named by Carlo Luigi Spegazzini